Tim Reeves (born 28 August 1972) is an English sidecar racer from Tenterden, Kent. He is an eight times Superside FIM World Sidecar Champion, twice with his younger brother Tristan (2005, 2006), once with Patrick Farrance (2007) and once with Ashley Hawes (2012) as passenger.

In 2014 he won the Superside World Championship and the World F2 Sidecar Trophy in the Motorsport Arena Oschersleben with French passenger Gregory Cluze.

In 2008 Reeves and Farrance entered in their first Isle of Man Sidecar TT finishing an outstanding third place in race one and sixth in race two. In 2013 Reeves, with passenger Dan Sayle finally got to the top step of the TT podium in Sidecar TT Race 1.

In the 2008 Sidecar World Championship Reeves and Farrance placed second behind Pekka Päivärinta and Timo Karttiala (LCR-Suzuki GSX-R 1000).
.

In 2017, Reeves featured heavily in the film 3 Wheeling, an observational documentary filmed during TT period of 2016. The film premiered on 7 May 2017, followed by a limited theatrical release of 61 screenings in cinema's in Northern Ireland and the Isle of Man.

References

External links
  Official site
  Official site
  superside.com

1972 births
Living people
English motorcycle racers
Isle of Man TT riders
Sidecar racers